Wishaw railway station is a railway station in Wishaw, North Lanarkshire, Scotland.

History 
It was previously known as Wishaw Central until the closure of the town's station nearby on the WCML in 1958, which was known as "Wishaw South".

Services

Historical 

1974 to 1979 
An hourly electric service was provided between Glasgow Central High Level, running non-stop to Motherwell, as Shieldmuir station did not open until 1987.

1979 to 2001 

From 1979 until 2001 an hourly electric service was provided Monday to Saturday between Lanark and  running via Motherwell and Bellshill. The service was initially non-stop to Motherwell, however in 1987 a new intermediate station was opened at Shieldmuir.

An hourly Sunday service was introduced in 1997.

From 2001 
The station is currently served by a mixture of  units and refurbished  units.

Since 2001, the following ScotRail service pattern has been in place -:

Monday to Saturday
Daytime
 1tph - Lanark to Dalmuir, via Bellshill, Glasgow Central and Yoker
 1tph - Lanark to Milngavie, via Hamilton and Glasgow Central

Evening
 1tph - Lanark to Partick, via Bellshill and Glasgow Central

 Saturdays excepted, there are also several peak-hour limited stop services, towards Glasgow in the morning, and towards Lanark in the evening. The Glasgow bound limited stop services are well used, and normally full on departure from Wishaw.

Sunday
 1tph - Lanark to Milngavie, via Bellshill and Glasgow Central

Other services
Since the December 2013 timetable change, the station has also been served by a regular Glasgow Central - Carstairs - Edinburgh semi-fast service in each direction, giving a through journey time of 48-50 minutes to Edinburgh.

From December 2014 

A recast of the Argyle Line timetable in the wake of the Whifflet Line electrification has seen some significant changes to the service pattern.

The line is heavily used for freight services also, with several Freightliner container trains a day from the nearby Coatbridge terminal to destinations in the south of England such as Felixstowe and Southampton. It is also used by services to the Mossend freight terminal as well as those travelling from the West Coast Main Line to the Highlands.

The line through Wishaw station is heavily used during engineering work on the adjacent West Coast Main Line (less than 1 km to the west of the station) which brings a wide variety of rolling stock to the line.

Facilities
The station has a small (25 spaces) car park and ticket office staffed from Monday to Saturday.

See also 
List of places in North Lanarkshire
List of places in Scotland

References

Notes

Sources 

 
 
 
 RAILSCOT on Wishaw Deviation Line

Wishaw
Railway stations in North Lanarkshire
Former Caledonian Railway stations
Railway stations in Great Britain opened in 1880
Railway stations served by ScotRail
SPT railway stations